Getúlio is a 2014 Brazilian biographical drama film written by George Moura and directed by João Jardim, starring Tony Ramos as Brazilian president Getúlio Vargas, based on the final moments of the crisis that led to the death of the then president, during the 19 days before the August 24, 1954.

The film was released in Brazil on May 1, 2014, coinciding with the Workers' Day official holiday – in reference to the labor policies implemented by Getúlio.

Plot
The plot begins in August 1954, after the attempted murder of Carlos Lacerda (Alexandre Borges), owner of the opposition newspaper, then, president Getúlio has to confront with the increasing instability of his government, in addition to the charges of ordering the murder of his political enemy.

Cast

 Tony Ramos as Getúlio Vargas
 Drica Moraes as Alzira Vargas
 Alexandre Borges as Carlos Lacerda
 Leonardo Medeiros as General Caiado
 Fernando Luís as Benjamim Vargas
 Daniel Dantas as Afonso Arinos de Melo Franco
 Murilo Elbas as João Zaratimi 
 Sílvio Matos as General Carneiro de Menezes
 José Raposo as Nero Moura
 Adriano Garib as General Genóbio da Costa
 Thiago Justino as Gregório Fortunato
 Luciano Chirolli as General Tavares
 Marcelo Médici as Lutero Vargas
 Clarisse Abujamra as Darcy Vargas

Production

Development
With experience in documentary films, the director João Jardim has gathered an extensive material research, including films and rare books, documents and biographies of contemporary politicians, as well as notes of Alzira Vargas, Getúlio's daughter. "This allowed a deep dive on the contradictory figure of the political leader, and nationalist dictator," praises Tony Ramos.

The idea for the film came about, according to the director, shortly after filming the documentary Pro Dia Nascer Feliz about education and schools in Brazil. "What I loved was not talking about Getúlio, but tell a story that echoes still today, which is connected with the formation of our country, with our current moment".

Jardim revealed that chose Tony Ramos for the role due to his similarities of personality with the character. "Getúlio was reserved and charismatic, I was looking for someone like that, and the differential of Tony was the talent. He does everything brilliantly" admits, emphasizing the originality of the story in his film. "It's a story that completes 60 years and that had never been told," he said.

Filming
Filming took place in the Catete Palace, in Rio de Janeiro, seat of the federal government at the time and where Getúlio killed himself with a gunshot to the chest, in 1954.

Awards 

At 2015 Grande Prêmio do Cinema Brasileiro the film won three awards: 
 Tony Ramos as Best Actor; 
 Tiago Marques as Best Artistic Director; 
 Martín Macias Trujillo as Best Make-up Artist.

References

External links
 

2014 biographical drama films
2014 films
Biographical films about presidents of Brazil
Brazilian biographical drama films
Films about politicians
Films set in Rio de Janeiro (city)
Films set in 1954
Films shot in Rio de Janeiro (city)
2010s political drama films
Films scored by Federico Jusid
Vargas Era
2014 drama films